Zebi Hirsch ha-Kohen Scherschewski (1840–1909) was a Russian Hebrew writer.

Biography 
Scherschewski was born at Pinsk in 1840. While still a boy he studied Hebrew grammar and archaeology without a teacher. After serving as secretary of the Jewish community of Pinsk, he went to the Crimea, where, at Melitopol, he entered the service of a merchant named Seidener. Later he became assistant editor of Aleksander Zederbaum's Ha-Melitz. During the Russo-Turkish war he followed the Russian army as a sutler; and after a second short stay with his former employer, Seidener, he settled in 1883 at Rostov-on-the-Don, where he opened a bookstore.

In addition to numerous contributions to current Hebrew journals, Scherschewski wrote Boser Avot (Odessa, 1877), a satirical poem on the neglect of the education of Jewish children in Russia, and Iyyun Sifrut (Vilna, 1881), on the development of Jewish literature and its significance as a cultural element for raising the Jews to a higher moral standing.

Partial bibliography

References 
 

Hebrew-language writers
1840 births
1909 deaths
Jews from the Russian Empire
Writers from the Russian Empire
People of the Haskalah